In molecular biology, DLG2 antisense RNA (non-protein coding), also known as DLG2AS, is a human long non-coding RNA. In humans it is located on chromosome 11q14. Its expression is reduced in patients with schizophrenia. It may act as an antisense regulator of DLG2.

See also
 Long noncoding RNA

References

Further reading

External links
 

Non-coding RNA